The Al Sulaimi Flag is an old heritage flag used historically by the Al Bin Ali tribe until the 1960s in Bahrain, Qatar, Kuwait, and the Eastern province of the Kingdom of Saudi Arabia. It consists of four red and three white stripes with seven red triangles facing towards the west.

.    

The current flag of Bahrain and Qatar is derived from the Al Sulami Flag and was used by the Al-Khalifa and Al-Sabah when they were in Kuwait in the early eighteenth century.

Al Bin Ali, a self-governed tribe with its own flag

The Al Bin Ali were a politically important group that moved backwards and forwards between Qatar and Bahrain, they were the original dominant group of Zubarah area.

The Al Bin Ali were known for their courage, persistence, and abundant wealth. They were also known historical wise as being a practically independent community in Bahrain since they are not forced to pay any sort of taxes by the Rulers of Bahrain Al Khalifa, therefore they were self-governed.

The Utub Al Bin Ali carry the Al-Sulami flag   as they call it in Bahrain, Qatar, Kuwait, and Eastern province in the kingdom of Saudi Arabia. It is red and white and is distinguished with four red stripes with three white stripes with seven triangles facing the west. It was raised on their ships during wartime and in the pearl season and on special occasions such as weddings and during Eid and in the "Ardha of war".

References

See also 
 History of Kuwait: The Anazia and Bani Utbah (Early Migration and Settlement)
 Zubarah
Bani Utbah
 History of Bahrain
 History of Qatar
 Murair

Bedouin society